Allenville may refer to:

Places
United States
 Allenville, Michigan
 Allenville, Missouri
 Allenville, Illinois
 Allenville, Wisconsin

See also
Allensville (disambiguation)